Chandragiri Fort (Malayalam: ചന്ദ്രഗിരി കോട്ട ) is a fort built in the 17th century, situated in Kasaragod District of Kerala, South India. The fort is now in ruins. The fort is located around 59 km south of Mangalore and 87 km north of Kannur at the mouth of the Chandragiri river.

See also
 Kannur Fort
 Thalassery Fort
 Bekal Fort
 Hosdurg fort

References

Image gallery

External links

 Kerala Tourism

Buildings and structures completed in the 17th century
Forts in Kerala
Buildings and structures in Kasaragod district
Tourist attractions in Kasaragod district
17th-century fortifications